Ahmed Sherif Fouad Aboulkheir (22 June 1947 – 27 July 2021) was an Egyptian basketball player. He competed in the men's tournament at the 1972 Summer Olympics.

References

External links
 

1947 births
2021 deaths
Egyptian men's basketball players
1970 FIBA World Championship players
Olympic basketball players of Egypt
Basketball players at the 1972 Summer Olympics
Sportspeople from Alexandria